The 1971 BMC Invitational, also known as the British Motor Cars Invitational, was a women's tennis tournament that took place on indoor carpet courts at the Civic Auditorium in San Francisco in the United States. It was the initial tournament of the 1971 WT Women's Pro Tour and as such was the first all-female professional tournament as part of a women's tennis tour. The event was held from January 6 through January 9, 1971. The final drew an attendance of 3,100 spectators who saw first-seeded Billie Jean King won the singles title .

Finals

Singles

 Billie Jean King defeated  Rosie Casals 6–3, 6–4

Doubles

 Billie Jean King /  Rosie Casals defeated  Françoise Dürr /  Ann Jones 6–4, 6–7, 6–1

Prize money

References

External links
 1971 BMC Invitational draw

BMC Invitational
VS of California
Silicon Valley Classic
BMC Invitational
BMC Invitational